The term Conservatorio Nacional de Música (National Conservatory of Music) appears in the official name of several national conservatories (schools of music and other related arts) in the Spanish-speaking world:

 Conservatorio Nacional de Música (Argentina)
 
 
 
 
 Conservatorio Nacional de Música (Mexico)
 
  (Venezuela)